Anna Maria of Brunswick-Calenberg-Göttingen (born: 23 April 1532 in Münden; died: 20 March 1568 in Neuhausen near Königsberg in Prussia) was a Duchess of Brunswick-Lüneberg by birth and by marriage Duchess of Prussia.

Life 
Anna Maria was the daughter of Duke Eric I of Brunswick-Calenberg (1470–1540) and Elizabeth of Brandenburg (1510–1558).  She married in 1550 Margrave Albert I of Brandenburg-Ansbach (1490–1568), who had been created the first Duke of Prussia in 1525; she was his second wife.  Albert died of the plague on 20 March 1568 at Tapiau Castle.  Anna Maria herself died 16 hours later from the plague too.

Issue
Elisabeth (20 May 1551 – 19 February 1596).
Albert Frederick (29 April 1553 – 18 August 1618), who succeeded as Duke of Prussia.

Footnotes

Bibliography 

 

|-

Anna Marie
1532 births
1568 deaths
Anna Marie
16th-century German people
Duchesses of Prussia
Daughters of monarchs